Qaleh Ganj (also romanized as Qal‘eh Ganj and Qal‘eh-ye Ganj; also known as Ghal‘eh Ganj, Kalāteh-ye Ganj, Kalāt-i-Ganj, and Moḩammadābād) is a city and capital of Qaleh Ganj County, Kerman Province, Iran.  At the 2016 census, its population was 13,169 in 3,638 families.

History 
Investigation on the history of this city is very difficult and dramatic. It Belongs to the pre-Islamic and Nativity which 
shows relatives who have been living everywhere in this city. Remains from this civilization show the city is over 5,000 years old. Now people who live in this city are Persians, Balouch, Arabs, Bakhtiari and Afro-Iranians.

Language
The local language of Qale Ganj is Balochi, and a small minority speak Bashkardi which is closely related to the Garmsiri group, “KERMAN xvi. LANGUAGES,” Encyclopædia Iranica, XVI/3, pp. 301-315, available online at http://www.iranicaonline.org/articles/kerman-16-languages</ref>

References

Populated places in Qaleh Ganj County

Cities in Kerman Province